Gyula (Yula, Gula, Gila) was, according to Muslim and Byzantine sources, the title of one of the leaders, the second in rank, of the Hungarian tribal federation in the 9th–10th centuries. In the earliest Hungarian sources, the title name is only recorded as a personal name (Gyyla, Geula, Gyla, Iula).

According to the Hungarian chronicles, Transylvania was ruled by a line of princes called Gyula, and their country was occupied by King Stephen I of Hungary (1000/1001–1038).

Etymology

The title name has not convincing etymologies, but it is probably of Turkic origin, cf. *yula "torch".

The gyulas in the 9th century 
The first data of the title, recorded by Ibn Rusta and Gardizi, can be traced back to the earlier works of Abu Abdallah al-Jayhani. According to these earliest pieces of evidence, the Hungarians were ruled conjointly by two ‘kings’. The major one, called kende (or künde), enjoyed nominal leadership, while effective power was exercised by his colleague, inferior in rank, called the gyula. This peculiar form of governance (‘dual kingship’) is generally supposed to have been imitative of the Khazar Khaganate, which did indeed have a similar organization. However, the only thing that the Muslim sources tell us is that the gyula was in charge of the military matters of the tribal confederation; whereas there existed a legitimate ruler (the kende) who had little influence on army-related issues.

The gyulas in the 10th-11th centuries 

Following the Hungarian conquest of the Carpathian Basin around 896, the title gyula can be found in the De administrando imperio ("On the Governance of the Empire") written by the Byzantine Emperor Constantine Porphyrogenitus. The emperor confirms that around 950 the gyla was one of the two important officers who assisted the leader of Hungarian tribal federation; also, each tribe had a chieftain.

The Byzantine Ioannes Skylitzes in the second half of the 11th century recounted (using earlier written sources) the baptism of the Hungarian chieftain Gyula (or gyula) in Constantinople in the mid-10th century. According to Ioannes Skylitzes, Gyula stayed true to his new faith and took a missionary bishop, Hierotheos, with him. A Slavic source also contains related information.

The almost contemporary Annales Hildesheimenses ("The Annals of Hildesheim") recorded for 1003 that "King Stephen of Hungary led an army against his maternal uncle, King Gyula" and "obliged his country by force to adopt the Christian faith".

Persons named Gyula in the Hungarian chronicles

The Gesta Hungarorum written by an anonymous author 
The anonymous writer of the Gesta Hungarorum ("The Deeds of the Hungarians") was the first Hungarian chronicler who compiled the list of the seven Hungarian conqueror chiefs around 1210. At the seventh place we can find Tétény (Tuhutum), his son Horka (Horca) and the latter's sons, Gyula (Gyyla/Geula) and Zombor (Zubor). According to the author of the Gesta, Zombor (Zubor) was the father of the younger Gyula (Geula/Gyla). The Gesta also narrates that Tétény occupied the land of Transylvania from the Vlach (Romanian) Duke Gelou; neither Tétény nor Gelou are mentioned in other primary sources.

The family tree of the gyulas according to the anonymous author of the Gesta Hungarorum:
                                      Tétény (Tuhutum) ♂
                                                 │
                                       Horka (Horca) ♂
                             ┌───────────────────┴──────────────────────┐
                    Gyula (Gyyla/Geula) ♂                     Zombor (Zubor) ♂
                 ┌───────────┴──────────┐                               │
          Karold (Caroldu) ♀   Sarolt (Saroltu) ♀   Gyula the Younger (Geula/Gyla) ♂
                                     ∞ Géza ♂                 ┌─────────┴────────┐
                                        │               Bolya (Bua/Biua) ♂  Bonyha (Bucna) ♂    
                                    Stephen I ♂               │                  │
                                                         Maglód kindred (genus Maglout)

The Gesta Hungarorum written by Simon of Kéza 
Simon of Kéza, who wrote his Gesta Hungarorum between 1280 and 1285, inserted Gyula /Iula/ in connection to Transylvania in the list of the seven Hungarian conqueror chiefs. He, as opposed to the anonymous writer of the Gesta Hungarorum, wrote not about two but only one Gyula.

The Chronicon Pictum 

The chronicle increased the members of the Gyula family with the same name to three. However, it caused a problem for the author to separate these three persons.

The chronicle attributes the finding of the ruins of Gyulafehérvár (in Hungarian, ‘Gyula’s White Castle’; Apulum in Roman Dacia, now Alba Iulia, Romania) to the conqueror Gyula.

The family tree of the Gyula family according to the Chronicon Pictum:
                          Gyula I ♂
                 ┌──────────┴─────────┐
             Sarolt ♀              Gyula II ♂
             ∞ Géza ♂                 │
                                   Gyula III ♂

The list of the gyulas
The list of persons who held the gyula office is still subject to debate.

Many historians (e.g., György Györffy, Florin Curta) suggest that at the time of the Hungarian conquest Árpád was the gyula, who was later considered to be the ancestor of the dynasty that ruled Hungary until 1301. At any rate, Hungarian chroniclers are unanimous in reporting that the conquest of the Carpathian Basin was directed by Árpád. Florin Curta suggests that when the kende of the conquest (whom he does not name) died in 902, the leadership passed onto Árpád, and one of Árpád's kinsmen became gyula.

Other scholars (e.g., Gábor Vékony, C. A. Macartney) argues that Árpád was the kende, and the gyula was Kurszán (Chussal, Chussol) whose name, in contrast to Árpád, can be found in contemporary Western texts.

The Slavic source narrating the baptism of the Gyula in Constantinople in the middle of the 10th century mentions that his baptismal name was Stefan. According to the chronicle of Thietmar of Merseburg (975-1018), the name of King Stephen's uncle whose country was occupied by the Hungarian king in 1003 was Procui.

The following is the list of the gyulas supposed by modern historians:

Kurszán (before 894–902) or Árpád (before 894–902/after 902)
"Gyula I" or an unknown member of the Árpád dynasty (?–?); "Gyula I" may be identical to Kurszán
"Gyula II" (c. 952/953); his baptismal name was Stefan
"Gyula III" (c. 980 – c. 1003); his name may have been Procui

See also 
Hungarian prehistory
Grand Prince of the Hungarians
Horka (title)
Kende

Notes

References

Sources 
Primary sources
 Constantine Porphyronenitus (author), Moravcsik, Gyula (editor), Jenkins, Romilly J. H. (translator): De Administrando Imperio; Dumbarton Oaks, 2008, Washington, D. C; 
 Kézai, Simon (author), Veszprémy, László (editor), Schaer, Frank (translator): Gesta Hungarorum: The Deeds of the Hungarians; Central European University Press, 1999, Budapest; 

Secondary sources
 Berend, Nóra – Laszlovszky, József – Szakács, Béla Zsolt: The Kingdom of Hungary; in: Berend, Nora (Editor): Christianization and the Rise of Christian Monarchy: Scandinavia, Central Europe and Rus’ c. 900–1200; Cambridge University Press, 2007, Cambridge & New York; 
 Curta, Florin: Southeastern Europe in the Middle Ages 500–1250; Cambridge University Press, 2006, Cambridge; 
 Fügedi, Erik: The Realm of St Stephen: A History of Medieval Hungary, 895–1526; I. B. Tauris, 2001, London&New York; 
 Kristó, Gyula (general editor); Engel, Pál, and Makk, Ferenc (Editors): Korai Magyar történeti lexikon (9-14. század) /Encyclopedia of the Early Hungarian History (9th–14th centuries)/; Akadémiai Kiadó, 1994, Budapest;  (the entry "Anonymus" was written by Zoltán Kordé, "Árpád" by Gyula Kristó, "Gyalu" by Zoltán Kordé, "gyula" by Alfréd Márton, "Gyula" by Sándor László Tóth and László Szegfű, "Kézai Simon" by Tibor Almási, "Kurszán" by Sándor László Tóth, "Tétény" by Zoltán Kordé)
 Kristó, Gyula: Early Transylvania (895–1324); Lucidus Kiadó, 2003, Budapest; 
 Rady, Martyn: Nobility, Land and Service in Medieval Hungary; Palgrave (in association with School of Slavonic and East European Studies, University College London), 2000, New York; 
 Róna-Tas, András (author); Bodoczky, Nicholas (Translator): Hungarians and Europe in the Early Middle Ages: An Introduction to Early Hungarian History; Central European University Press, 1999, Budapest & New York; 

Magyar tribal chieftains
Medieval Transylvania
Hungary in the Early Middle Ages
Gesta Hungarorum